Lucia of Syracuse (283–304), also called Saint Lucia better known as Saint Lucy, was a Roman Christian martyr who died during the Diocletianic Persecution. She is venerated as a saint in the Catholic, Anglican, Lutheran, and Eastern Orthodox churches. She is one of eight women (including the Virgin Mary) explicitly commemorated by Catholics in the Canon of the Mass. Her traditional feast day, known in Europe as Saint Lucy's Day, is observed by Western Christians on 13 December. Lucia of Syracuse was honored in the Middle Ages and remained a well-known saint in early modern England. She is one of the best known virgin martyrs, along with Agatha of Sicily, Agnes of Rome, Cecilia of Rome and Catherine of Alexandria.

Sources
The oldest record of her story comes from the fifth-century Acts of the Martyrs. The single fact upon which various accounts agree is that a disappointed suitor accused Lucy of being a Christian, and she was executed in Syracuse, Sicily, in the year 304 during the Diocletianic Persecution. Her veneration spread to Rome, and by the sixth century to the whole Church. The oldest archaeological evidence comes from the Greek inscriptions from the Catacombs of St. John in Syracuse. Jacobus de Voragine's Legenda Aurea was the most widely read version of the Lucy legend in the Middle Ages. In medieval accounts, Saint Lucy's eyes were gouged out prior to her execution.
The most ancient archaeological traces attributable to the cult of Saint Lucia have been brought back to Sicily, particularly in Syracuse and are preserved in the archaeological museums of the city.

Life
All the details of her life are the conventional ones associated with female martyrs of the early fourth century. John Henry Blunt views her story as a Christian romance similar to the Acts of other virgin martyrs.

According to the traditional story, Lucy was born to rich and noble parents in the year 283 AD. Her father was of Roman origin, but died when she was five years old, leaving Lucy and her mother without a protective guardian. Her mother's name Eutychia seems to indicate that she came from a Greek background.

Like many of the early martyrs, Lucy had consecrated her virginity to God, and she hoped to distribute her dowry to the poor. However, Eutychia, not knowing of Lucy's promise, and suffering from a bleeding disorder, feared for Lucy's future. She arranged Lucy's marriage to a young man of a wealthy pagan family.

Saint Agatha had been martyred 52 years before during the Decian persecution. Her shrine at Catania, less than 50 miles from Syracuse, attracted a number of pilgrims; many miracles were reported to have happened through her intercession. Eutychia was persuaded to make a pilgrimage to Catania, in hopes of a cure. While there, St. Agatha came to Lucy in a dream and told her that because of her faith, her mother would be cured and that Lucy would be the glory of Syracuse, as she was of Catania. With her mother cured, Lucy took the opportunity to persuade her mother to allow her to distribute a great part of her riches among the poor.

Eutychia suggested that the sums would make a good bequest, but Lucy countered, "...whatever you give away at death for the Lord's sake you give because you cannot take it with you. Give now to the true Savior, while you are healthy, whatever you intended to give away at your death."

News that the patrimony and jewels were being distributed came to Lucy's betrothed, who denounced her to Paschasius, the Governor of Syracuse. Paschasius ordered her to burn a sacrifice to the emperor's image. When she refused, Paschasius sentenced her to be defiled in a brothel.

The Christian tradition states that when the guards came to take her away, they could not move her even when they hitched her to a team of oxen. Bundles of wood were then heaped about her and set on fire, but would not burn. Finally, she met her death by the sword thrust into her throat.

Absent in the early narratives and traditions, at least until the fifteenth century, is the story of Lucia tortured by eye-gouging. According to later accounts, before she died she foretold the punishment of Paschasius and the speedy end of the persecution, adding that Diocletian would reign no more, and Maximian would meet his end. This so angered Paschasius that he ordered the guards to remove her eyes. Another version has Lucy taking her own eyes out in order to discourage a persistent suitor who admired them. When her body was prepared for burial in the family mausoleum it was discovered that her eyes had been miraculously restored. This is one of the reasons that Lucy is the patron saint of those with eye illnesses.

Veneration
By the sixth century, her story was sufficiently widespread that she appears in the Sacramentary of Pope Gregory I. She is also commemorated in the ancient Roman Martyrology. St. Aldhelm (English, died in 709) and later the Venerable Bede (English, died in 735) attest that her popularity had already spread to England, where her festival was kept in England until the Protestant Reformation, as a holy day of the second rank in which no work but tillage or the like was allowed.

Lucy is honored in the Church of England and in the Episcopal Church on 13 December.

The monk Sigebert of Gembloux (1030–1112) wrote a mid-eleventh century passio, to support a local cult of Lucy at Metz.

The General Roman Calendar formerly had a commemoration of Saints Lucy and Geminianus on 16 September. This was removed in 1969, as a duplication of the feast of her dies natalis on 13 December and because the Geminianus in question, mentioned in the Passio of Saint Lucy, seems to be a fictitious figure, unrelated to the Geminianus whose feast is on 31 January.

Relics

Sigebert of Gembloux, in his sermo de Sancta Lucia, chronicled that her body lay undisturbed in Sicily for 400 years, before Faroald II, Duke of Spoleto, captured the island and transferred the body to Corfinium in the Abruzzo, Italy. From there it was removed by the Emperor Otho I in 972 to Metz and deposited in the church of St. Vincent. It was from this shrine that an arm of the saint was taken to the monastery of Luitburg in the Diocese of Speyer – an incident celebrated by Sigebert in verse.

The subsequent history of the relics is not clear. According to Umberto Benigni, Stephen II (768) sent the relics of St. Lucy to Constantinople for safety against the Saracen incursions. On their capture of Constantinople in 1204, the French found some relics attributed to Saint Lucy in the city, and Enrico Dandolo, Doge of Venice, secured them for the monastery of St. George at Venice. In 1513 the Venetians presented to Louis XII of France the saint's head, which he deposited in the cathedral church of Bourges. Another account, however, states that the head was brought to Bourges from Rome, where it had been transferred during the time when the relics rested in Corfinium.

Parts of the body are present in Sicily in particular in Syracuse, which has preserved them from antiquity.
The remainder of the relics remain in Venice: they were transferred to the church of San Geremia when the church of Santa Lucia was demolished in 1861 to make way for the new railway terminus. A century later, on 7 November 1981, thieves stole all her bones, except her head. Police recovered them five weeks later, on her feast day. Other parts of the corpse have found their way to Rome, Naples, Verona, Lisbon, Milan, as well as Germany and France.

Patronage
Lucy's Latin name Lucia shares a root (luc-) with the Latin word for light, lux. A number of traditions incorporate symbolic meaning of St. Lucy as the bearer of light in the darkness of winter, her feast day being 13 December. Because some versions of her story relate that her eyes were removed, either by herself or by her persecutors, she is the patron saint of the blind.

She is also the patron saint of authors, cutlers, glaziers, laborers, martyrs, peasants, saddlers, salesmen, stained glass workers, and of Perugia, Italy. She is invoked against hemorrhages, dysentery, diseases of the eye, and throat infections.

St. Lucy is the patroness of Syracuse in Sicily, Italy. At the Piazza Duomo in Syracuse, the church of Santa Lucia alla Badia houses the painting Burial of St. Lucy by Caravaggio. She is also the patron saint of the coastal town of Olón, Ecuador, Colombia, which celebrates with a week-long festival culminating on the feast day 13 December. She is also the patron saint of the town of Guanes, Santander, Colombia.

The Caribbean island of Saint Lucia, one of the Windward Islands in the Lesser Antilles, is named after her.

Iconography

The emblem of eyes on a cup or plate apparently reflects popular devotion to her as protector of sight, because of her name, Lucia (from the Latin word "lux" which means "light"). In paintings St. Lucy is frequently shown holding her eyes on a golden plate. Lucy was represented in Gothic art holding a dish with two eyes on it. She also holds the palm branch, symbol of martyrdom and victory over evil. Other symbolic images include a lamp, dagger, sword or two oxen.

In literature

Dante
Lucy first appears in Canto 2 of Inferno, the first canticle of Dante Alighieri's Divine Comedy, as the messenger sent to Beatrice from "The blessed Dame" (the Virgin Mary), to rouse Beatrice to send Virgil to Dante's aid. Henry Fanshawe Tozer identifies Lucia as representing "illuminative grace". According to Robert Pogue Harrison and Rachel Jacoff, Lucia's appearance in this intermediary role is to reinforce the scene in which Virgil tries to fortify Dante's courage to begin the journey through the inferno.

In Purgatorio 9.52–63, Lucy carries a sleeping Dante to the entrance to purgatory. Since Lucy represents light, her appearance in Purgatorio 9 mirrors her appearance in Inferno 2; both times she carries him out of darkness. Lucy's light symbolism also explains why Dante tells this evening scene in Purgatorio 9 through the lens of the dawn. She carries him both out of the literal darkness to a new day, as well as the figurative darkness to lead him to salvation.

Then in Paradiso 32, Dante places her opposite Adam within the Mystic Rose in Canto XXXII of the Paradiso. Lucy may also be seen as a figure of Illuminating Grace or Mercy or even Justice.

Donne
In the Late Middle Ages the shortest day of the year usually fell on her feast day, and the two became associated, as in John Donne's poem, "A Nocturnal upon St. Lucie's Day, being the shortest day" (1627). The poem begins with: "'Tis the year's midnight, and it is the day's". Due to the inaccuracy of the Julian Calendar, the shortest day actually fell a day or two earlier in Donne's time.

Lucia is also the protagonist of a Swedish novel: "Ett ljus i mörkret" ("A light in the darkness") by Agneta Sjödin.

Popular celebration

Lucy's feast is on 13 December, in Advent. Her feast once coincided with the Winter Solstice, the shortest day of the year, before calendar reforms, so her feast day has become a festival of light.

St. Lucy is the patron saint of the city of Syracuse (Sicily).  On 13 December a silver statue of St. Lucy containing her relics is paraded through the streets before returning to the Cathedral of Syracuse.  Sicilians recall a legend that holds that a famine ended on her feast day when ships loaded with grain entered the harbor. Here, it is traditional to eat whole grains instead of bread on 13 December. This usually takes the form of cuccìa, a dish of boiled wheat berries often mixed with ricotta and honey, or sometimes served as a savory soup with beans.

This is particularly seen in Scandinavian countries, with their long dark winters. There, a young girl dressed in a white dress and a red sash (as the symbol of martyrdom) carries palms and wears a crown or wreath of candles on her head. In Denmark, Norway, Sweden, and parts of Finland, girls dressed as Lucy carry St. Lucia buns in procession as songs are sung. It is said that to vividly celebrate St. Lucy's Day will help one live the long winter days with enough light.

A special devotion to St. Lucy is practiced in the Italian regions of Lombardy, Emilia-Romagna, Veneto, Friuli Venezia Giulia, Trentino-Alto Adige, in the North of the country, and Sicily and Calabria, in the South, as well as in the Croatian coastal region of Dalmatia. The feast is a Catholic-celebrated holiday with roots that can be traced to Sicily. On the 13th of every December it is celebrated with large traditional feasts of home-made pasta and various other Italian dishes, with a special dessert called cuccìa, made of wheatberries, butter, sugar, chocolate, and milk. The large grains of soft wheat are representative of her eyes and are a treat only to be indulged in once a year. In North Italy, Saint Lucy brings gift to children between 12 and 13 December. Traditionally a bouquet of hay is put outside of the house for Lucy's Donkey and food in the house for Lucy to refresh them after the long night bringing gifts to every kid. In small towns, a parade with Saint Lucy is held the evening of the 12th when she goes through the main streets of the town munching sweets and candy from her cart, always together with her donkey. 

A Hungarian custom is to plant wheat in a small pot on St. Lucy's feast. By Christmas green sprouts appear, signs of life coming from death. The wheat is then carried to the manger scene as the symbol of Christ in the Eucharist. 

In the Philippines, villagers from Barangay Sta. Lucia in Magarao, Camarines Sur, hold a novena to St. Lucy nine days before her feast. A procession of the saint's image is held every morning at the poblacion or village centre during the nine days leading up to St. Lucy's Day, attracting devotees from other parts of the Bicol Region. Hymns to the saint, known as the Gozos, as well as the Spanish version of the Ave Maria are chanted during the dawn procession, which is followed by a Mass.

The feast day is also commemorated in Barangay Sucad in Apalit Pampanga after the traditional nine-day novena, where a whole day celebration is observed through Eucharistic Masses, festivals and the procession of the religious sculpture of Sta. Lucia in the evening before the evening Mass.

List of dedications to Saint Lucy

Churches

 Saint Lucy's church, chapel, cathedral, Syracuse, Sicily, Italy
 , Naples, Italy
 Saint Lucia's Church, Upton Magna, Shropshire, England
 Chiesa di Santa Lucia, Belpasso, Catania, Sicily, Italy
 Saint Lucy's Church, Methuen, Massachusetts, United States
 Church of Saint Lucia (Iglesia de Santa Lucía), Mérida, Mexico
 St. Lucia Church, Puthoor, India
 St. Lucia Church, Erayumanthurai, India
 St. Lucia's Cathedral, Kotahena, Sri Lanka
 Church of San Geremia and the grave of Saint Lucy, Venice, Italy
  (Church of St. Lucia Outside the Walls), Syracuse, Sicily, Italy
 Chiesa di Santa Lucia alla Badia, also Syracuse, Sicily, Italy
 St. Lucy Catholic Church, Highland Beach, Florida, United States
 St. Lucie Catholic Church, Port St. Lucie, Florida, United States
 Église Sainte-Lucie de Vallières, Metz, Moselle, France
 St. Lucy's National Shrine at Micoud, Saint Lucia
 St. Lucy, Virgin and Martyr Parish, Capalonga, Camarines Norte, Philippines
 Sta. Lucia Parish, Barangay Sta. Lucia, Sasmuan, Pampanga, Philippines
 Sta. Lucia Parish, Barangay Manggahan, Pasig, Philippines
 Sta. Lucia Parish, Barangay Sta. Lucia, Novaliches, Quezon City Philippines
 Santa Lucia in San Jose Recoletos Parish Church, Cebu City, Philippines
 Sta. Lucia Chapel, Barangay Sta. Lucia, Magarao, Camarines Sur, Philippines
 Sta. Lucia Chapel, Barangay Sta. Lucia, Samal, Bataan
 Sta. Lucia Chapel, Barangay Sta. Lucia, San Miguel, Bulacan
 Sta. Lucia Chapel, Barangay Sta. Lucia, San Juan City, Metro Manila, Philippines
 Sta. Lucia Chapel, Barangay Sta. Lucia, San Luis, Pampanga
 Sta. Lucia Chapel, Barangay Punturin, Valenzuela City, Metro Manila, Philippines
 Sta. Lucia Chapel, Barangay Sta. Lucia, Lubao, Pampanga, Philippines
 Sta. Lucia Chapel, Barangay Sta. Lucia, Masantol, Pampanga, Philippines
 Sta. Lucia Chapel, Barangay Sta. Lucia, Sta. Ana, Pampanga, Philippines – CPC rj simbillo
 Sta. Lucia Cupang, Chapel, Arayat, Pampanga, Philippines
 Sta. Lucia Chapel, Barangay Pinulot, Dinalupihan, Bataan
 Sta. Lucia Chapel, Barangay Sucad, Apalit, Pampanga, Philippines
 Sta. Lucia Chapel, Valenzuela, Metro Manila, Philippines
 Sta. Lucia Mini-Parish, De Castro Subd., Barangay Sta. Lucia, Pasig, Philippines 
Sta.Lucia chapel, Calumpit, Bulacan Philippines
 Namayan Chapel, Barangay Namayan, City of Malolos, Bulacan, Philippines
Sta.Lucia Holy Mt.Banahaw, Dolores, Quezon Province, Philippines
 St. Lucy's Church (Manhattan) (parish established 1900; present church built 1915), New York, United States
 St. Lucy's Church (established in 1927), Bronx, New York, United States
 Sta. Lucia Catholic Church, El Paso, Texas, United States
 St. Lucy's Church, Newark, New Jersey, United States
 Church of St. Lucija, Santa Luċija, Gozo, Malta
 St. Lucy's Chapel, St Lucy Street, Naxxar, Malta
 Medieval Chapel of St. Lucy, limits of Mtarfa Malta
 New Church of St. Lucy, Mtarfa, Malta
 Medieval Chapel of Saint Lucija, Gudja, Malta
 St. Lucia's Cathedral, Sri Lanka
 St. Lucia Church, Poonapity, Kaddaikadu, Puttlam, Sri Lanka
 Santa Luzia Church, Viana Do Castelo, Portugal
 St. Lucy's Church, North Lanarkshire, Scotland
 Cerkev Svete Lucije, Skaručna, Slovenia
 Iglesia de Sta. Lucia, Maracaibo, Venezuela
Iglesia de Sta. Lucia, Miranda, Venezuela
 St. Lucy's Church, Syracuse, New York, United States
 St. Lucy Catholic Church, Houma, Louisiana, United States
 Saint Lucia Church, Ruiru Membley, Kiambu, Kenya
 Chapel of Saint Lucy, Barcelona Cathedral, Spain
 Parroquia Santa Lucía, Paraná, Entre Ríos, Argentina
 Sta. Lucia Parish Church, Sta. Lucia, Asturias, Cebu, Philippines
 St. Lucy Croatian Catholic Church, Troy, Michigan, United States
 St. Lucy's Church, Jurandvor, Baška, Croatia
 St. Lucy's Church, Pazin, Croatia
 St. Lucy's Church, Kostrena, Croatia
 St. Lucy's crypt, inside of Cathedral of Saint Domnius, Split, Croatia
 Parroquia y Santuario Santa Lucía, Ciudad de Buenos Aires, Argentina.
 Hermitage of Santa Lucía, Valencia, Valencian Community, Spain
 St. Lucy's Church, Scranton, Pennsylvania, United States
 Santa Lucia Chapel, Barangay, Malandog, Hamtic, Antique, Philippines
 Igreja Matriz de Santa Luzia, Carangola, Minas Gerais, Brazil.
 Igreja de Santa Luzia Doutor Severiano, Rio Grande do Norte, Brazil
 Catedral de Santa Luzia Mossoró, Rio Grande do Norte, Brazil
 Igreja de Santa Luzia, Rafael Fernandes, Rio Grande do Norte, Brasil
 Igreja de Santa Luzia, Carnaubais, Rio Grande do Norte, Brazil
 Igreja de Santa Luzia, Vertentes-Jaguaribe Ceará, Brasil
 La Iglesia de Santa Lucía, Santa Lucía de Tirajana, Gran Canaria
 Parroquia ni Sta. Lucia in the Municipality of Narvacan, Ilocos Sur

Places
 St. Lucia, a country in the Caribbean
 Barangay Sta. Lucia, Novaliches, Quezon City, Metro Manila, Philippines
 Barangay Sta. Lucia, Pasig, Metro Manila, Philippines
 Borgo Santa Lucia, Naples, Italy
 Port St. Lucie, Florida, United States
 Saint Lucy, Barbados, Caribbean
 Sainte-Lucie-de-Beauregard, Quebec, Canada
 Sainte-Lucie-des-Laurentides, Quebec, Canada
 Santa Lucia Chapel, Barangay Sucad, Apalit, Pampanga (Philippines)
 Santa Lucía de Tirajana (Gran Canaria) Canary Islands, Spain
 Santa Lucia, Ilocos Sur, Philippines
 Santa Lucía, La Rioja, Argentina
 Santa Lucia, Magarao, Camarines Sur, Philippines
 Santa Lucia, Malta
 Santa Lucia Mountains, California, United States
 Santa Luċija, Gozo
 Sta. Lucia, Asturias, Cebu, Philippines
 Sta. Lucia Village Phase 4, Punturin, Valenzuela City, Metro Manila, Philippines
 St. Lucie County, Florida, United States
 St. Lucie Village, Florida, United States
 St. Lucia Estuary, KwaZulu-Natal, South Africa
 St Lucia, Queensland, Australia
 St. Lucy's Holy Well, Killua Castle, Clonmellon, County Westmeath, Ireland
Santa Luzia, Minas Gerais, Brazil
Santa Lucía del Tuy, Miranda, Venezuela
 Santa Lucía, Canelones, Uruguay

Schools
 St Lucia Girls High School Kauti, Nunguni, Makueni County, Kenya
 Sta. Lucia Elementary School, Masantol, Pampanga, Philippines
 Sta. Lucia Elementary School, De Castro Subd., Barangay Sta. Lucia, Pasig, Philippines
 St. Lucy Integrated School of Manila, Malate, Manila, Philippines
 St. Lucia's School, Kotahena, Colombo, Sri Lanka
 St. Lucy Catholic Elementary School, Brampton, Ontario, Canada
 St. Lucy Catholic Elementary School, Toronto, Ontario, Canada (defunct)
 St. Lucy Catholic Elementary School, Edmonton, Alberta, Canada
 Sta. Lucia High School Novaliches, Quezon City, Metro Manila, Philippines
 Santa Lucia Catholic School, Chicago, Illinois, United States
 St. Lucy's Priory High School, Glendora, California, United States
 St. Lucy Day School for the Blind and Visually Impaired, Philadelphia, Pennsylvania, United States
 St. Lucy's School of Archdiocese of Pampanga, Sasmuan, Pampanga, Philippines
 St. Lucy's School (dedicated in 1955), Bronx, New York, United States
Sta. Lucía del Tuy, Miranda, Venezuela

Other
 Santa Lucía Hill, otherwise known as Cerro Huelen, Santiago, Chile
 Venezia Santa Lucia railway station, Venice, Italy
 Sta. Lucia Mall, Cainta, Rizal, Philippines

See also

 List of Christian women of the patristic age
 List of Eastern Orthodox saints
 List of Roman Catholic saints
 Saint Paraskevi, a female, Eastern saint frequently displayed with eyes on a plate.
 Saint Lucy, patron saint archive
 Saint Odile, another saint of the blind.

References

Further reading
Saint Lucy (Dec. 13) in "Ælfric's Lives of Saints", by Ælfric of Eynsham London, Pub. for the Early English text society, by N. Trübner & co. (1881).

External links

Books

Celebrations

Iconography
 
 

283 births
304 deaths
Italian saints
Sicilian saints
3rd-century Roman women
4th-century Roman women
Virgin martyrs
4th-century Christian saints
4th-century Christian martyrs
Syracuse, Sicily
Late Ancient Christian female saints
Christianity in Sicily
Anglican saints
Christians martyred during the reign of Diocletian
Christmas gift-bringers